Walt Disney Animation Studios is an American animation studio headquartered in Burbank, California, the original feature film division of The Walt Disney Company. The studio's films are also often called "Disney Classics", or "Disney Animated Canon".

The studio has produced 61 films, beginning with Snow White and the Seven Dwarfs in 1937, one of the first full-length animated feature films, and the first produced in the United States. The studio's most recent release is  Strange World in 2022, with their next release being Wish on November 22, 2023, followed by three untitled films in 2024, 2025, and 2026. The numbering and inclusion of the canon varies by region, with some parts of the world including 2006's The Wild (being an animated film released under Walt Disney Pictures before Walt Disney Feature Animation became an independent division).

Filmography
This list includes the films made by Walt Disney Animation Studios.

Released films

Upcoming films

Unspecified films with dates
These films are unspecified but have confirmed dates from The Walt Disney Studios.

In-development projects
In February 2023, Disney CEO Bob Iger announced that a third Frozen and second Zootopia films are in development.

Related productions

Reception

Box office grosses

Critical response

Academy Award wins and nominations

See also

 List of Walt Disney Animation Studios short films
 List of Disney live-action adaptations and remakes of Disney animated films
 List of Disney theatrical animated features

 List of Pixar films
 List of 20th Century Studios theatrical animated feature films
 List of Blue Sky Studios productions
 List of unproduced Disney animated projects
Disneytoon Studios

Notes

References

External links
 

 
Walt Disney Pictures animated films
Walt Disney Animation
Walt Disney Animation Studios films
Disney